The Ministry of Youth and Sportsis one of the ministries of the Iraqi government, specialized in youth affairs and sports. As of January 2022, the minister is Ahmed Al-Mubarqa proceeding Iraqi football legend Adnan Dirjal and Abdul-Hussein Abtaan.

References

Government ministers of Iraq
Sports ministers
Foreign relations of Iraq